The Morgue is a 2008 direct-to-DVD horror film directed by Halder Gomes and Gerson Sanginitto, and written by Najla Ann Al-Doori and Andrew Pletcher.

Plot synopsis

The protagonist Margo Dey is paying her way through college by working part-time in a morgue. Her only living companion in the long nights at the morgue is George, the night watchman, who is stricken with grief from the loss of his daughter. As the story unfolds more characters, including Jill, a frightened young girl, are introduced.

Cast

Critical reception 

Allan Dart, writing for Fangoria, found the directors Gomes and Sanginitto went for psychological suspense instead of mere gore, but felt the film was predictable. Dread Central called it "cheap fun, better than expected, but come the next day you'll hardly remember its name."

See also
 List of American films of 2008

References

External links 
 

2008 films
2008 horror films
Direct-to-video horror films
American horror films
Films directed by Halder Gomes
2000s English-language films
2000s American films